Himapatha is a 1995 Indian Kannada-language romantic drama film directed by Rajendra Singh Babu and produced by Rockline Venkatesh. The film stars Vishnuvardhan, Suhasini and Jaya Prada. The film was widely popular for the songs composed by Hamsalekha upon release. The film was extensively shot in Shimla and Bijapur. It is based on the Kannada novel of the same name, by T. K. Rama Rao.

Plot
The plot revolves around a photographer Aravind (Dr. Vishnuvardhan) of Kannada Prabha. He works in Bijapur. He is in love with Sumithra (Suhasini). One day, Kittanna, the editor of Kannada Prabha gives him an offer to take the photos of avalanche occurrences in Shimla. Kittanna wants to send those photos to National Geographic Magazine. At the same time, Sumithra's mother challenges Aravind to earn ₹ 3,00,000 within a month. If he fails, Sumithra's wedding would take place with Keerthi (Jai Jagadish). Aravind goes to Shimla. What happens next is the rest of the story.

Cast 
 Vishnuvardhan as Aravind / Gautham
 Suhasini as Sumithra
 Jaya Prada as Naina
 C. R. Simha as Professor, Naina's Father
 Jai Jagadish as Dr. Keerthi
 Jayanthi as Fathima Didi
 Leelavathi as Aravind's Mother
 Umashree as Geetha, Sumithra's Friend
 Bank Janardhan as d'Souza
 Sudheer as Abdullah, Fathima's Husband
 Dingri Nagaraj as Barber
 M. S. Umesh as Geetha's Husband

Soundtrack 

The music of the film was composed and lyrics written by Hamsalekha. The audio was released by Lahari Music company.

References

External links 

 Song list at Musicindiaonline

1995 films
1990s Kannada-language films
Indian romantic drama films
1995 romantic drama films
Films shot in Jammu and Kashmir
Films scored by Hamsalekha
Films directed by Rajendra Singh Babu
Films shot in Bijapur, Karnataka